Alexander Angelin (born 30 January 1990) is a Swedish footballer who plays for Västra Frölunda as a defender.

Club career
In 2013, Angelin signed for Utsiktens BK.

On 8 March 2022, Angelin returned to Västra Frölunda.

References

External links

Alexander Angelin at Fotbolltransfers

1990 births
Living people
Association football midfielders
Västra Frölunda IF players
GAIS players
Utsiktens BK players
BK Häcken players
Swedish footballers
Superettan players
Allsvenskan players
Ettan Fotboll players